The Deutscher Schachbund (DSB, the German Chess Federation) had been founded in Leipzig on July 18, 1877. When the next meeting took place in the Schützenhaus, Leipzig on July 15, 1879, sixty-two clubs had become members of the federation. Hofrat Dr. Rudolf von Gottschall became Chairman and Hermann Zwanzig the General Secretary. When foreign players were invited to Berlin in 1881, an important and successful formula was completed. A master tournament was organised every second year, and Germans could partake in many groups and their talents qualified for master tournaments by a master title in the Hauptturnier. 

The Berlin 1881 chess tournament (the second DSB Congress,2.DSB-Kongreß), organised by Hermann Zwanzig and Emil Schallopp, took place in Berlin from August 29 to September 17, 1881.

Masters Tournament
The final standings and crosstable:

{|class="wikitable"
! # !! Player !! 1 !! 2 !! 3 !! 4 !! 5 !! 6 !! 7 !! 8 !! 9 !! 10 !! 11 !! 12 !! 13 !! 14 !! 15 !! 16 !! 17 !! Total
|-
|1 ||  ||x ||1 ||1 ||1 ||0 ||½ ||1 ||1 ||½ ||1 ||1 ||1 ||1 ||1 ||1 ||1 ||1 ||14 
|- 
|2 ||  || 0 ||x ||½ ||1 ||½ ||1 ||1 ||1 ||½ ||1 ||0 ||0 ||1 ||1 ||½ ||1 ||1 ||11
|-  
|3 ||  || 0 ||½ ||x ||0 ||1 ||0 ||1 ||½ ||1 ||1 ||1 ||0 ||1 ||1 ||½ ||1 ||1 ||10½ 
|- 
|4 ||  || 0 ||0 ||1 ||x ||0 ||0 ||0 ||½ ||1 ||1 ||1 ||1 ||1 ||1 ||1 ||1 ||1 ||10½
|- 
|5 ||  || 1 ||½ ||0 ||1 ||x ||½ ||½ ||0 ||½ ||1 ||0 ||1 ||0 ||1 ||1 ||½ ||1 ||9½
|- 
|6 ||  || ½ ||0 ||1 ||1 ||½ ||x ||½ ||1 ||½ ||0 ||1 ||0 ||½ ||1 ||0 ||1 ||1 ||9½  
|-
|7 ||  || 0 ||0 ||0 ||1 ||½ ||½ ||x ||1 ||½ ||0 ||0 ||1 ||½ ||1 ||1 ||1 ||½ ||8½
|- 
|8 ||  || 0 ||0 ||½ ||½ ||1 ||0 ||0 ||x ||1 ||1 ||½ ||1 ||0 ||½ ||1 ||½ ||1 ||8½  
|-
|9 ||  || ½ ||½ ||0 ||0 ||½ ||½ ||½ ||0 ||x ||0 ||0 ||1 ||1 ||½ ||1 ||1 ||1 ||8
|-
|10 ||  || 0 ||0 ||0 ||0 ||0 ||1 ||1 ||0 ||1 ||x ||½ ||1 ||½ ||1 ||½ ||½ ||1 ||8  
|-
|11 ||  || 0 ||1 ||0 ||0 ||1 ||0 ||1 ||½ ||1 ||½ ||x ||0 ||½ ||½ ||0 ||½ ||1 ||7½ 
|- 
|12 ||  || 0 ||1 ||1 ||0 ||0 ||1 ||0 ||0 ||0 ||0 ||1 ||x ||1 ||0 ||1 ||0 ||1 ||7
|- 
|13 ||  || 0 ||0 ||0 ||0 ||1 ||½ ||½ ||1 ||0 ||½ ||½ ||0 ||x ||0 ||1 ||½ ||1 ||6½
|- 
|14 ||  || 0 ||0 ||0 ||0 ||0 ||0 ||0 ||½ ||½ ||0 ||½ ||1 ||1 ||x ||1 ||1 ||1 ||6½ 
|- 
|15 ||  || 0 ||½ ||½ ||0 ||0 ||1 ||0 ||0 ||0 ||½ ||1 ||0 ||0 ||0 ||x ||1 ||1 ||5½  
|-
|16 ||  || 0 ||0 ||0 ||0 ||½ ||0 ||0 ||½ ||0 ||½ ||½ ||1 ||½ ||0 ||0 ||x ||0 ||3½  
|-
|17 ||  || 0 ||0 ||0 ||0 ||0 ||0 ||½ ||0 ||0 ||0 ||0 ||0 ||0 ||0 ||0 ||1 ||x ||1½  
|-
|18 ||   || - ||- ||0 ||0 ||- ||- ||- ||- ||0 ||- ||- ||- ||- ||- ||- ||- ||- || –  
|}

Hauptturnier A
The Haupturnier A was won by Curt von Bardeleben, who earlier beat Berthold Lasker, Siegbert Tarrasch and Seger, in a preliminary group.

The final results:

1. Bardeleben 2½/3 (won a preliminary group, scoring 3/3)

2. Specht 2/3 (won a prel. group, scoring 2/3)

3. Kist 1½/3 (won a prel. group, scoring 2/2)

4. Reif 0/3 (won a prel. group, scoring 2/3)

References

Chess competitions
Chess in Germany
1881 in chess
1881 in Germany
19th century in Berlin
August 1881 sports events
September 1881 sports events